Anietie “Anny” Robert (born 28 October 1990) is a Nigerian portrait photographer and creative director in Niger State, Nigeria.

Education 
Robert studied computer science at the Covenant University.

Career 
After years as a graphic artist, Robert began his photography career in 2014. 

Robert has photographed Folorunsho Alakija, Burna Boy, Davido, Donald Duke, Tony Elumelu, Ice Prince, and WizKid. Robert and Ari Labadi own the photo studio StudioX. 

Robert has been included on several lists of as one of the top and most popular photographers in Nigeria and Africa. His photography depicts the intense exploration of ideas and human realities. 

In 2020 Anny served as a judge for the OPPO Mobile's Redefinition Photography Contest, in a series designed to test OPPO F11 Pro photography ability, documented the lives of young Lagosians.

He discovered and has promoted the model Amaka.

Social activism 
Robert has used his photography for social activism, one example being a photo session for breast cancer survivor Omolara Cookey as part of breast cancer awareness activities in 2017.  That same year, Robert released a series of images investigating the identity of the modern woman. 

In 2019, collaborating with MAJU (a female fashion brand in Nigeria), Anny's session called "I am Woman" in celebration of Women's History Month. This session features the fashion model Aduke Bey, and Angel Obasi, a Nigerian stylist.

In 2020 Robert launched the "Women for Women" campaign, which highlighted women activists in Nigeria.

Exhibits 
In August 2020 Robert was one of several photographers in the digital exhibition "A Moment in History", put on by House of ZETA.

In December 2022 Robert was included as part of "The Ascension", an art show in Lagos designed by Áwurè.

References 

People from Lagos State
Covenant University alumni
Fashion photographers
Nigerian photographers
1990 births
Living people